Elisabetta Gnone (born 13 April 1965) is an Italian writer.

Biography
Gnone became a journalist for Topolino Weekly in 1992. This was only the beginning of a career that would take her to Walt Disney Italia, where she collaborated in the series of monthly publications of Bambi, Minnie & Comp. and the Small Series, and created, in 1997, the publication of Winnie the Pooh. As the director responsible for Disney publications, she created a series which would become a worldwide success: W.I.T.C.H. She then published The Secret of the Twins in 2005. The book was developed into a trilogy focused around the magical world Fairy Oak.

In April 2001, she co-created the Italian comic/magazine W.I.T.C.H. with Alessandro Barbucci and Barbara Canepa. The publication was later made into the television series of the same name. Gnone also wrote the children's trilogy Fairy Oak: Il segreto delle gemelle (The Secret of the Twins), L'incanto del buio (The Spell of Darkness), and Il potere della luce (The Power of Light). She expanded the Fairy Oak Universe with four more books, "The four mysteries": "Captain Grisam's love", "Shirley's wizarding days", "Flox smiles in autumn", and "Good-bye Fairy Oak".

References

Italian women writers
W.I.T.C.H.
1965 births
Living people